Charles James Richardson Whittle (26 September 1921 – 4 July 2001) was an English first-class cricketer.

While studying at Christ Church, Oxford, Whittle made two appearances in first-class cricket for Oxford University against Gloucestershire and Yorkshire, both at Oxford in 1947. In that same season he played minor counties cricket for Oxfordshire, making a single appearance against Devon in the Minor Counties Championship. He died 64 years later in July 2001.

References

External links
 

1921 births
2001 deaths
People from Birkenhead
Alumni of Christ Church, Oxford
English cricketers
Oxford University cricketers
Oxfordshire cricketers